Cereopsius luhuanus is a species of beetle in the family Cerambycidae. It was described by Heller in 1896. It is known from Sulawesi and Moluccas.

Subspecies
 Cereopsius luhuanus luhuanus Heller, 1896
 Cereopsius luhuanus ternatensis Breuning, 1956

References

Cereopsius
Beetles described in 1896